Foreman College and Career Academy formerly, Foreman High School), is a public 4–year high school located in the Portage Park neighborhood of Chicago, Illinois, United States. Foreman is operated by the Chicago Public Schools district. Established in 1928, the school is named in the honor of a Chicago banker and civic leader, Edwin G. Foreman.

Curriculum

Student services 
Foreman High School provides several programs for students with limited English proficiency, including:
 Bilingual programs—Spanish and Polish
 Variety of English as a Second Language (ESL)/Bilingual courses
Foreman offers honors and Advanced Placement (college level courses).

Special education programs 
Foreman provides Free Appropriate Public Education programs, including:
 Cooperative Team Teaching Program; Special Education
 Instructional Program; Support for Bilingual Special Education Students

Athletics
Foreman's varsity athletic teams are named the Hornets and competes in the Chicago Public League (CPL) and is a member of the Illinois High School Association (IHSA). The boys' basketball team were regional champions two times (2009–2010 and 2016–2017). In 1999–2000, the boys' cross country were Class AA. The boys' soccer team were public league champions one time (1993–1994 and 1996–1997), regional champions three times (2002–2003, 2014–2015 and 2015–2016) and Class AA one time (2002–2003). 
The Foreman Hornets compete in a variety of fall, winter and spring interscholastic competitive sports administered by the Chicago Public High School League including;
 Fall sports: Cheer-leading (Girls), Cross Country (Boys/Girls), Football (Boys), Soccer (Boys), Volleyball (Girls)
 Winter sports: Basketball (Boys/Girls), Wrestling (Boys) Bowling (Boys/Girls), Cheer-leading (Girls), Swimming (Boys)
 Spring sports: Baseball (Boys), Soccer (Girls), Softball (Girls), Track (Boys/Girls), Volleyball (Boys), Water-polo (Boys/Girls)

Clubs and Activities
Foreman High School has a number of clubs and activities such as: Academic Decathlon, Aspira, Asian Club, Black Heritage Club, Chess Club, Computer Club, Drama Club, Humanitarian Club, Math Club, National Honor Society, Newspaper, Peer Health Advocates, Photography Club, Polish Club, Scholastic Achievers, Student Council, Student Development Team, and Yearbook.

Other Information
Exterior shots of the school is used in the Disney Channel family sitcom Raven's Home.

Notable people 
The following are notable people associated with Foreman High School. If the person was a Foreman High School student, the number in parentheses indicates the year of graduation; if the person was a faculty or staff member, that person's title and years of association are included.
 Rod Blagojevich — (1974), politician; former Illinois governor.
 Peter Francis Geraci — (attended), Chicago-based bankruptcy attorney.
 George (Bear) Miller -(1974), United States Army Green Beret; LTC    
 Gertrude Lempp Kerbis - (1944) Noted Chicago architect (FAIA), designer of central rotunda at O'Hare Airport (Seven Continents), US Air Force Academy Dining Hall (Colorado Springs), Don Kerbis Tennis Club (Highland Park, IL)USA

References

External links
 
 Chicago Public Schools: Foreman

Public high schools in Chicago
Educational institutions established in 1928
1928 establishments in Illinois